Tai Yeung Che is a village in Lam Tsuen, Tai Po District, Hong Kong.

External links

 Delineation of area of existing village Tai Yeung Che (Tai Po) for election of resident representative (2019 to 2022)

Villages in Tai Po District, Hong Kong
Lam Tsuen